Niyazbey "Niyazi" Aleksandrovich Dzyapshipa (Russian: Ниязбей Александрович Дзяпшипа;  14 November 1927 – 5 January 1993) was a Soviet association football defender from Abkhazia, Georgia. He took up football at a late age of 16 in 1943, and spent most of his career playing as a central defender for Dinamo Tbilisi, finishing second in the Soviet national championships in 1953 and third in 1947 and 1950. He played 20 matches for the Soviet national team. After retiring from competitions he worked as a coach for Dinamo Tbilisi (1969–1970) and Dinamo Sukhumi (1984).

References 

FC Dinamo Sukhumi players
Footballers from Abkhazia
Soviet footballers
1927 births
1993 deaths
Association football defenders